Alexander Peya and Bruno Soares were the defending champions and successfully defended the title, defeating Ivan Dodig and Marcelo Melo in the final, 6–4, 6–3.

Seeds
All seeds receive a bye into the second round.

Draw

Finals

Top half

Bottom half

References

Rogers Cup Doubles
2014 Rogers Cup